The British Rail Class 489 (GLV) is a type of electric multiple unit, specially converted for use on Gatwick Express trains, from London Victoria to Gatwick Airport.

The units were converted from Class 414 driving motors cars, by Eastleigh Works in 1983-84, for use on the new Gatwick Express service. They were used to allow push-pull operations, on the London-end of the rakes of Class 488 stock, with a Class 73 locomotive at the other end and both used for propulsion. The units were used as baggage cars.

Units were given unit numbers in the range 489101-489110, with individual carriages numbered 68500-68509. However, purely for aesthetic purposes, only the last four digits of the set numbers were shown, to fit with the traditional Southern style (maintained until privatisation by British Rail's Southern region) - older (pre-TOPS) units were originally assigned four-digit numbers. The units were originally painted in BR Blue/Grey livery, which was quickly replaced by InterCity livery. The final livery carried by these units is a variation of the InterCity livery, with a claret stripe and Gatwick Express lettering.

Operations
Upon privatisation of British Rail, the Gatwick Express franchise was won by National Express.

Gatwick Express
Immediately after privatisation, the Class 489 fleet was exclusively used by Gatwick Express on all their London Victoria-Gatwick Airport shuttles. However, new units, in the form of Class 460 'Juniper' units were built from 2000, with the aim of completely replacing the old stock. By 2002, sufficient new trains were in service to allow six Class 489 units to be removed from traffic, leaving four units retained as cover in case of failure of one of the new trains. Two of these  subsequently withdrawn so that by the end of 2004, only two units (nos. 489104/110) were still in use, as reliability of the 'Juniper' units had not improved sufficiently to totally replace all the old trains. They were finally withdrawn in 2005, following improvements to the "Juniper" fleet reliability.

Other operators
Since finishing with Gatwick Express, several units have been sold to other operators.

Network Rail
Network Rail have purchased four units, 489102, 489105, 489106 and 489109. They were stored for several years, but were returned to use in early-2006 as deicing and load-bank vehicles.

Preservation
Four units have been preserved on heritage railways. Two of the units were donated by Porterbrook Leasing in 2003 to the Ecclesbourne Valley Railway in Derbyshire, which now uses one as a buffet car and the other a museum. The final two units in use with Gatwick Express were preserved in early 2006.
489101 (68500) - Ecclesbourne Valley Railway.
489104 (68503) - Spa Valley Railway
489107 (68506) - Ecclesbourne Valley Railway
489110 (68509) - Barry Tourist Railway
Another unit, 489108, was bought by a private owner for preservation at Nottingham Transport Heritage Centre, but it was sent for scrap in May 2009.

Fleet status
The final Gatwick Express units were withdrawn in 2005. Both of these units (nos. 489104/110) had been withdrawn in 2000 and 2001 respectively, but were overhauled and returned to use in 2002. They replaced units 489103/108, which were withdrawn from traffic as they were due overhaul.

Network Rail returned its two units to service in 2006, following a period in store.

The current status of the fleet is shown below.

References

Sources

489
Non-passenger multiple units
Train-related introductions in 1984
750 V DC multiple units